Naya Nazimabad is a housing project that is being developed, built around the Manghopir Lake. Naya Nazimabad Cricket Stadium is the home ground for the Karachi Kings, a PSL franchise owned by ARY's CEO Salman Iqbal.

A couple years back, the heavy rain in Karachi caused some blocks of the housing project to be flooded because of inadequate sewage and water disposal lines, however the management has now taken adequate measures to prevent a similar situation in the future. Residents of some blocks claimed that they had difficulties once the flooding began that remained for over a week. However, allegedly some media houses blew the actual problem out of proportion.

The land was given initially for mining to the Javedan corporation for a mining lease only. Later, Arif Habib Ghani and Aqeel Karim Dhedhi, a business cartel, bought it with the help of government authorities for a fair price and launched a housing project.

Total Area 
The total area of Naya Nazimabad is 1,300 acres.

Master Plan

Location 
Distances from various areas are mentioned below:

Prices 
Naya Nazimabad was sold to general public at the rate of Rs 6,300 per yard, its worth Rs 60,000 by October 2019, resulting in net wealth generation of Rs 95 bn.

Demography

Naya Nazimabad Project is towards it completion accompanied with completion of all odds which are emerging time to time. The house prices have also shot up making Naya Nazimabad one of the prime locations for residence in Karachi.  In the future, the community may house up to 300,000 people.

Naya Nazimabad Cricket Ground 

Naya Nazimabad Cricket Ground is also the home ground for the PSL franchise, Karachi Kings owned by ARY Group's CEO Salman Iqbal. Behind the cricket ground, the Naya Nazimabad Gymkhana is also under construction that will provide residents with recreational activities and other sports areas.

Designed in-line with the international standards, the cricket stadium is fully functional with five ready to play pitches and equipped with all top of the line facilities like full floodlights, pavilion stand | dressing & shower-rooms, practice pitches etc.

History 
The Javedan Cement Limited (JCL) was privatized and sold at very low prices of Rs. 4.3 billion ($43 million) to Haji Ghani and Shunaid Qureshi. The new owners almost immediately stopped production, dismantled the cement factory and converted the 1,300 acres JCL land into a housing project worth over Rs. 100 billion ($1 billion). Experts believe the cost of total JCL land including mining land could easily cross Rs. 200 billion ($2 billion). The developers of Naya Nazimabad project includes owner of Arif Habib Equity. According to experts, the closing of Javedan Cement and establishment of Naya Nazimabad will cost Pakistan government $ 6 million annually.

Land was given initially for mining to the Javedan corporation for a mining lease only. Later, Arif Habib Ghani and Aqeel Karim Dhedhi, a business cartel, bought it with the help of government authorities for a meager price and launched a housing project.

Javedan Corporation Limited 
Javedan Corporation Limited, a builder of Naya Nazimabad Housing Scheme, owned 928 acres 99-year leasehold land allotted in 1960/61; 310 acres freehold land, and 128 acres leasehold land allotted in 2011.

Equity Injection 
Arif Habib proposed fresh investment of Rs 750 million into Naya Nazimabad.

Chemical Dump 
A case was filed in the Sindh High Court (SHC) against the Naya Nazimabad residential scheme near Manghopir that has allegedly been launched despite a report claiming that the area has been used dumping ground for factory waste. These chemicals are hazardous substances which could harm human health and/or the environment. A study commissioned on the directives of the Supreme Court of Pakistan has found that the populations residing in Gadap Town and nearby areas may be affected by chemicals as it is air-borne.

Shunaid Qureshi, developer of Naya Nazimabad, CEO Al Abbas Sugar Mills and former Chairman of Pakistan Sugar Mills Association (PASMA) was arrested in January 2014. Shunaid Qureshi is a son of Hum TV director Sultana Siddiqui, nephew of businessman Jahangir Siddiqui, brother-in-law of Television producer Momina Duraid and the cousin of actor Sheheryar Munawar Siddiqui. Jahangir Siddiqui son Ali is married to the daughter of Mir Shakil-ur-Rahman, owner of Jang Group of Newspapers.

Flooding in August 2020
The site for the development was acquired for a cement factory by Arif Habib Corporation through their Javedan Corporation. It is located in the Manghopir neighborhood of Karachi. The site was later repurposed for the housing development by draining part of the Manghopir Lake. In the 2020 flooding of Karachi due to heavy rainfall in the monsoon season, the lake refilled and some of the houses were flooded and had to be evacuated by the Pakistan Army.

In 2020, the some part of housing scheme was flooded because of a wall broken by residents of nearby areas. However, adequate measures have been taken to prevent any future incident.

See also 
 Manghopir 
 Nazimabad
 Gulshan-e-Iqbal
 North Nazimabad
 North Nazimabad Town
 North Karachi
 Environment of Karachi
 Pakistan Environmental Protection Agency

References

External links 
 Karachi Website.

Neighbourhoods of Karachi
Gadap Town